The Trout House was one of three hotels in antebellum Atlanta, Georgia, along with the Atlanta Hotel and Washington Hall. It was built in 1849 by Jeremiah F. Trout. It was a four-story brick building at the southwest corner of Decatur and Pryor Streets, facing the union depot and State Square.

Confederate President Jefferson Davis spoke here during his visit to Atlanta of February 16, 1861, although he did not spend the night.

The hotel was destroyed during General Sherman's burning of Atlanta.

See also 

 Hotels in Atlanta

References

Hotel buildings completed in 1849
Demolished hotels in Atlanta
Railway hotels in the United States
Burned hotels in the United States
1849 establishments in Georgia (U.S. state)